The 1913 North Cork by-election was held on 4 November 1913. The by-election was held due to the death of the incumbent All-for-Ireland MP, Patrick Guiney. It was won by his brother John Guiney, the All-for-Ireland candidate, who was returned unopposed.

References

1913 elections in Ireland
1913 elections in the United Kingdom
By-elections to the Parliament of the United Kingdom in County Cork constituencies
Unopposed by-elections to the Parliament of the United Kingdom (need citation)